Gobustan is a town and municipality in and the administrative center of the Gobustan District of Azerbaijan. It has a population of 3,945.

In 2009, the town renamed from Maraza to Gobustan. The city is home to Diri Baba Mausoleum.

See also
 Ganja, Azerbaijan
 Sumqayit
 Nakhchivan

References

External links

Populated places in Gobustan District